Sphaerosoma is a genus of fungi in the family Pyronemataceae. It contains three hypogeous (truffle-like) species that have been collected from Europe and North America.

References

Pyronemataceae
Pezizales genera